Lake Elmenteita is a soda lake, in the Great Rift Valley, about 120 km northwest of Nairobi, Kenya.

Geography 

Elmenteita is derived from the Maasai word , meaning "dust place", a reference to the dryness and dustiness of the area, especially between January and March. The town of Gilgil is near the lake. In the south-to-north sequence of Rift Valley lakes, Elmenteita is between Lake Naivasha and Lake Nakuru. The major Nairobi-Nakuru highway (A104 Road) runs along the nearby escarpment affording motorists a spectacular vista towards the lake. Today the lake is a protected area due to its bird life, and has been named as an UNESCO heritage site together with Lake Nakuru and Lake Bogoria.

At the southern end of the lake are the "Kekopey" hot springs, in which an introduced fish, the Lake Magadi tilapia, breed. The reed beds nearby are fishing grounds for night herons and pelicans.

History 

The Lake Elmenteita area saw its first white settlement when Lord Delamere (1879-1931) established Soysambu, a  ranch, on the western side of the lake. Delamere gifted the land on the other side of  the lake to his brother-in-law, the Honorable Galbraith Lowry Egerton Cole (1881-1929), part of whose "Kekopey Ranch", where he is buried, is preserved today as the Lake Elementaita Lodge.

Soysambu ranch is still occupied by Lord Delamere's descendants, including the controversial Thomas Cholmondeley who has been instrumental in setting up the Soysambu conservancy. The conservancy covers 2/3 of the shoreline and is home to over 12000 wild animals.

Lake Elmenteita has been a Ramsar site since 2005.

Ecology 

Over 400 bird species have been recorded in the Lake Nakuru/Lake Elmenteita basin. Elmenteita attracts visiting flamingoes, both the greater and lesser varieties, which feed on the lake's crustacean and insect larvae and on its suspended blue-green algae, respectively. Lake Magadi tilapia were introduced to the lake from Lake Magadi in 1962 and since that time the flamingo population has dwindled considerably. The tilapia attract many fish-eating birds that also feed upon the flamingo eggs and chicks. Over a million birds that formerly bred at Elmenteita are now said to have sought refuge at Lake Natron in Tanzania.

The lake's shores are grazed by zebra, gazelle, eland and families of warthog.

The lake is normally very shallow (less than 1 m deep) and bordered by trona-encrusted mudflats during the dry seasons. During the late Pleistocene and early Holocene, Lake Elmenteita was at times united with an expanded Lake Nakuru, forming a much larger dilute lake. Remnants of the former joined lake are preserved as sediments at various locations around the lake basins, including former shorelines.

Recently the lake level and number of flamingoes has receded as increased human activity has dried up catchment areas.

Associated sites 

Nearby is the Kariandusi Museum, at an important prehistoric site where stone handaxes and cleavers were discovered in 1928 by Louis Leakey.

Elmenteita Badlands is a lava flow to the south of the lake, covered in bush and including some spectacularly scenic peaks.

References 

Lakes of Kenya
Saline lakes of the Great Rift Valley
World Heritage Sites in Kenya
Ramsar sites in Kenya